Oyuklu, historically known as Taka is a village located in the Midyat District of the Mardin Province in southeastern Turkey. 

The village is populated by Kurds who adhere to Yazidism.

Population

References 

Villages in Midyat District
Tur Abdin
Yazidi villages in Turkey
Kurdish settlements in Mardin Province